Miodrag Karadžić (Serbian Cyrillic: Миодраг Караџић; born 20 January 1987) is a Montenegrin footballer who plays for Pljevlja 1997.

External links

1987 births
Living people
People from Žabljak
Association football midfielders
Montenegrin footballers
FK Rudar Pljevlja players
FK Kom players
KF Laçi players
FK Igalo 1929 players
Montenegrin First League players
Kategoria Superiore players
Montenegrin Second League players
Montenegrin expatriate footballers
Expatriate footballers in Albania
Montenegrin expatriate sportspeople in Albania